Martin Grohe (born 1967) is a German mathematician and computer scientist known for his research on parameterized complexity, mathematical logic, finite model theory, the logic of graphs, database theory, and descriptive complexity theory. He is a University Professor of Computer Science at RWTH Aachen University, where he holds the Chair for Logic and Theory of Discrete Systems.

Education
Grohe earned his doctorate (dr. rer. nat.) at the University of Freiburg in 1994. His dissertation, The Structure of Fixed-Point Logics, was supervised by Heinz-Dieter Ebbinghaus.
After postdoctoral research at the University of California, Santa Cruz and Stanford University, he earned his habilitation at the University of Freiburg in 1998.

Books
Grohe is the author of Descriptive Complexity, Canonisation, and Definable Graph Structure Theory (Lecture Notes in Logic 47, Cambridge University Press, 2017). In 2011, Grohe and Johann A. Makowsky published as editors the 558th proceedings of the AMS-ASL special session on Model Theoretic Methods in Finite Combinatorics, which was held on January 5-8 2009 in Washington, DC. With Jörg Flum, he is the co-author of Parameterized Complexity Theory (Springer, 2006).

Recognition
Grohe won the Heinz Maier–Leibnitz Prize awarded by the German Research Foundation in 1999.
He was elected as an ACM Fellow in 2018 for "contributions to logic in computer science, database theory, algorithms, and computational complexity".

References

External links

1967 births
Living people
German computer scientists
20th-century German mathematicians
Mathematical logicians
University of Freiburg alumni
Academic staff of RWTH Aachen University
21st-century German mathematicians